How High The Soundtrack is a soundtrack to Jesse Dylan's 2001 stoner film How High. It was released on December 11, 2001 through Def Jam Recordings and consists of hip hop music. The album contains twenty tracks featuring interpolations taken from the movie and songs performed by film stars Method Man & Redman, along with Cypress Hill, DMX, Jonell, Limp Bizkit, Ludacris, Mary J. Blige, Saukrates, Shawnna, Streetlife, and War.

The album peaked at number 38 on the Billboard 200 and at number 6 on the Top R&B/Hip-Hop Albums in the United States.

Several songs heard both in the movie and in the closing credits, such as "Hits from the Bong" and "I Wanna Get High" by Cypress Hill, "Wu Wear" by RZA, "Fire" by Ohio Players, "Jammin" by Bob Marley, "Du hast" by Rammstein, "Chin Check" by N.W.A, "Would You Mind" by Janet Jackson, "Sexy Ida" by Ike & Tina Turner, "Good Girls" by DMX, "Sweet Thing" by Mary J. Blige, "One Draw" by Rita Marley, "Flash Light" by Parliament, ''Click Click Boom" by Saliva, "The Payback" by James Brown, "B.O.B (Bombs Over Baghdad)" by Outkast, and "Slam" by Onyx, were not included in the soundtrack album.

Track listing
Credits adapted from the album's liner notes.

Sample credits
 "Part II" contains excerpts from "You're Making Me High", written by Toni Braxton, Kenneth Edmonds, and Bryce Wilson, and performed by Toni Braxton.
 "Cisco Kid" contains a sample from "The Cisco Kid", performed by War.
 "How to Roll a Blunt" contains a sample from "Keep Rising to the Top" by Kenneth Burke.
 "All I Need (Razor Sharp Remix)" contains an interpolation of "You're All I Need to Get By", written by Nickolas Ashford and Valerie Simpson.
 "Big Dogs" contains a sample from "Tell 'Em", written by Erick Sermon.
 "How High Remix" contains a sample from "I Am Woman", performed by The Cover Girls.  It also contains an interpolation of "Fly Robin Fly", written by Sylvester Levay and Stephan Prager.

Charts

Weekly charts

Year-end charts

References

External links

2001 soundtrack albums
Comedy film soundtracks
Hip hop soundtracks
Albums produced by DJ Premier
Albums produced by Hi-Tek
Albums produced by Pete Rock
Albums produced by Saukrates
Albums produced by Rockwilder
Albums produced by Terry Date
Albums produced by Mathematics
Albums produced by Swizz Beatz
Def Jam Recordings soundtracks
Albums produced by Erick Sermon
Albums produced by Scott Storch
Albums recorded at Electric Lady Studios
Method Man albums
Redman (rapper) albums
Cannabis music